Dawn Caroline Harper (born 21 March 1963 in Trowbridge), known professionally as Dr Dawn Harper, is an English doctor, media personality and television presenter known for co-presenting the Channel 4 television series Embarrassing Bodies opposite Pixie McKenna and Christian Jessen. She works as a part-time GP in Stroud, Gloucestershire and runs several private clinics.

Early life and career
Harper attended the Royal High School, Bath, at which she excelled at languages and science. She then spent a gap year working with the event rider Mary King.

Career
Harper trained as a doctor at Charing Cross and Westminster Medical School and is a member of the Royal College of Physicians. She also holds the diploma of child health and family planning, her particular area of expertise being women’s health and menstrual disorders.

Harper is a part-time GP in Stroud, Gloucestershire.

Television
Harper appeared on the Channel 4 series Embarrassing Bodies and Embarrassing Bodies: Live from the Clinic. She also appears regularly on This Morning as a medical expert. Harper gives medical advice on Woman's Hour on BBC Radio 4.

Harper has made guest appearances on shows including 10 O'Clock Live, The Gadget Show and The Wright Stuff. She also appeared on Channel 4's Paralympics Breakfast Show and a special Paralympic edition of The Million Pound Drop. In October 2014, Harper took part in a Children in Need episode of The Great British Sewing Bee on BBC Two.

Dawn co-presented Born Naughty?, a four-part series for Channel 4 alongside Ravi Jayaram. The series began on 14 May 2015.

Writing
Harper has written for several publications, including Mother and Baby magazine and Healthy Food Guide. In 2007, a book entitled, Dr. Dawn's Health Check was published by Mitchell Beazley.

Personal life
Harper has three children. She was injured in a road accident in 2003 and took two years to recover.

References

External links

Living people
1963 births
English television personalities
English television presenters
21st-century British medical doctors
Channel 4 people
People educated at the Royal High School, Bath
Alumni of Charing Cross and Westminster Medical School